Calloria is a genus of fungi in the family Dermateaceae. The genus, which was first described by Elias Magnus Fries in 1836, contains 4 species.

See also 
 List of Dermateaceae genera

References 

Dermateaceae genera